The Voice of Armenia (Armenian: Հայաստանի Ձայնը pronounced Hayastani Dzayne) is an Armenian television singing competition created by John de Mol. The first season was broadcast on Armenia TV. The show premiered in late 2012 and continued until 2017. The rules of the show are based on The Voice of Holland and The Voice (U.S.) and include blind auditions (in Armenian Կույր լսումներ), 'wild card' round, battle phase (in Armenian Մենամարտ), and live rounds (in Armenian Գալա համերգներ).

The Voice of Armenia is open not only to artists from Armenia, but also to Armenians from the Armenian diaspora including Russia. As of January 2023, there is no information about a fifth season.

Coaches Timeline

Series overview

Season details

Season 1 (2012–2013)
The judges of the first season (2012–2013) were Sona, Tata Simonyan, Sofi Mkheyan and Arto Tunçboyaciyan.

Competitors' table
 – Winner
 – Runner-up
 – Third
 – Fourth
 – Eliminated

The winner was Mary "Masha" Mnjoyan from Team Sona with 52.9% of the popular vote in the final broadcast on 30 March 2013. The runner-up was Narek Makaryan from Team Sofi with 25.7% of the vote. Gayané Arzumanian from Team Arto came third and Iskuhi Hovhannisyan from Team Tata fourth. In the final, four Armenian contestants from Russian Voice Golos were invited to perform in the Armenian version. They were Artyom Kacharyan, Edward Khachatryan, Gayane Zakharova, and Margarita Pozoyan.

Season 2 (2013–2014)
The judges of the second season (2013–2014) were Shushan Petrosyan, Hayko, Christine Pepelyan and Michael Poghosyan.

Competitors' table
 – Winner
 – Runner-up
 – Third
 – Fourth
 – Eliminated

Season 3 (2014–2015) 
The coaches of the third season (2014–2015) are Sona, Armen Martirosyan, Eva Rivas, and Hayko.

1st place: Raisa Avanesyan (team Sona)
2nd place: Meline Galoyan (team Hayko)
3rd place: Erna Mirzoyan (team Armen)
4th place: Vahe Aleqsanyan (team Eva)

Season 4 (2017) 
Format was back to Armenia after 2 years of break. The broadcaster has changed the website of that talent show. The coaches of the fourth season (2017) are Arame, Nune Yesayan, Sevak Khanaghyan, and Sofi Mkheyan.

Competitors' table
 – Winner
 – Runner-up
 – Third
 – Fourth
 – Eliminated

References

Armenia
2012 Armenian television series debuts
2017 Armenian television series endings
Armenian reality television series
2010s Armenian television series
Armenian music television series
Armenia TV original programming